Niyazgulovo (Niyaźğol) is a rural locality (a village) in Tashbulatovsky Selsoviet, Abzelilovsky District, Bashkortostan, Russia. The population was 168 as of 2010. There are 8 streets.

Geography 
Niyazgulovo is located 69 km northeast of Askarovo (the district's administrative centre) by road. Novobalapanovo is the nearest rural locality.

References 

Rural localities in Abzelilovsky District